The 9th Cinemalaya Independent Film Festival was successfully held from July 26 to August 4, 2013 in Metro Manila, Philippines. This year's theme is "Synergy of the Senses", which makes the entries to deliver mature content and provocative themes. The opening film is Jazz in Love by Baby Ruth Villarama, a documentary about a Filipino gay man who waits for the arrival of his German boyfriend. The closing film is Joel Lamangan's Burgos which stars Lorna Tolentino as Edita Burgos, the crusading mother of missing activist Jonas. The winners were announced on August 4 at the Cultural Center of the Philippines, Jerrold Tarog's Sana Dati and Hannah Espia's Transit won top film honors in the awards night.

Entries
The fifteen feature-film entries are divided into two separate competitions. The five feature-film entries will compete under the Directors Showcase which are presented by veteran film directors of the country. While the other ten feature-film entries will compete under the New Breed section which are presented by first-time or young filmmakers working today. The Short Film section has also ten competing entries. The winning film is highlighted with boldface and a dagger.

Directors Showcase

New Breed

Short films

Awards

Here is the list of winners in this year's Cinemalaya Independent Film Festival held Sunday night, August 4, at the Tanghalang Nicanor Abelardo (Main Theater) of the Cultural Center of the Philippines.

Full-Length Features
Directors Showcase
 Best Film - Sana Dati by Jerrold Tarog
 Special Jury Prize - Ekstra by Jeffrey Jeturian
 Audience Award - Ekstra by Jeffrey Jeturian
 Best Direction - Jerrold Tarog for Sana Dati
 Best Actor - (no awardee)
 Best Actress - Vilma Santos for Ekstra
 Best Supporting Actor - TJ Trinidad for Sana Dati
 Best Supporting Actress - Ruby Ruiz for Ekstra
 Best Screenplay - Zig Dulay, Antoinette Jadaone and Jeffrey Jeturian for Ekstra
 Best Cinematography - Mackie Galvez for Sana Dati
 Best Editing - Pats R. Ranyo for Sana Dati
 Best Sound - Roger TJ Ladro for Sana Dati
 Best Original Music Score - Jerrold Tarog for Sana Dati
 Best Production Design - Ericson Navarro for Sana Dati

New Breed
 Best Film - Transit by Hannah Espia
 Special Jury Prize - Quick Change by Eduardo Roy Jr.
 Audience Award - Transit by Hannah Espia
 Best Direction - Hannah Espia for Transit
 Best Actor - Mimi Juareza for Quick Change
 Best Actress - Irma Adlawan for Transit
 Best Supporting Actor - Joey Paras for Babagwa
 Best Supporting Actress - Jasmine Curtis for Transit
 Special Jury Citation for Best Acting Ensemble  - The cast of Transit (Irma Adlawan, Marc Alvarez, Mercedes Cabral, Jasmine Curtis, Ping Medina)
 Best Screenplay - Eduardo Roy Jr. for Quick Change
 Best Cinematography - Ber Cruz and Lyle Nemenzo Sacris for Transit 
 Best Editing - Benjamin Tolentino and Hannah Espia for Transit
 Best Sound - Michael Idioma for Quick Change
 Best Original Music Score - Mon Espia for Transit 
 Best Production Design - Roy Red for Rekorder

Special Awards
 NETPAC Award 
 Directors Showcase - Ekstra by Jeffrey Jeturian
 New Breed - Transit by Hannah Espia

Short films
 Best Short Film - The Houseband's Wife by Paulo O'Hara
 Special Jury Prize - Taya by Adi Bontuyan
 Special Citation - Sa Wakas by Ma. Veronica Santiago
 Best Direction - Jann Eric Tiglao for Onang
 Best Screenplay - Paulo O'Hara for The Houseband's Wife

References

External links
Cinemalaya Independent Film Festival

Cinemalaya Independent Film Festival
Cinemala
Cinemala
2013 in Philippine cinema